Joe van Zyl (born ) is a South African rugby union player for the  in Super Rugby. His regular position is hooker.

van Zyl was named in the Bulls side for Round 2 of the Super Rugby Unlocked competition.

Honours
 Super Rugby Unlocked champion 2020
 Currie Cup champion 2021

References

South African rugby union players
Living people
1999 births
Rugby union hookers
Bulls (rugby union) players
Blue Bulls players